Bharbhunja may refer to:

 Bharbhunja (Hindu), a Hindu community found in the Indian subcontinent
 Bharbhunja (Muslim), a Muslim community found in the Indian subcontinent